The Greetings Tour is a traveling postcard mural project by mural artist Victor “Ving” Fung (born October 4, 1983) and photographer Lisa Beggs (born November 28, 1987).  The artist duo has been traveling the United States by RV since 2015 creating interactive postcard inspired murals as destination landmarks.  “It's inspired by vintage postcards from the 1930s to 1950s that read 'Greetings From,' which informs their project, Greetings Tour.”

Using the classic large letter postcard style, the Greetings Tour works with communities to create colorful murals featuring local landmarks, history and culture.  They have created murals in cities across the United States including Honolulu, Anchorage, San Diego, New Orleans, Moab, Chicago, Tucson and Louisville.  In 2019, they painted their first international mural as part of the series in Bermuda.

Lisa Beggs photographs the content from their travels and relevant images that goes into the mural designs.  Victor Ving  paints the images using spray paint and latex. Their goal is to paint a mural in every state and then take the project to an international level.  In April 2020, the artists announced a yearly grant to donate a mural back to community oriented organizations and those who have been impacted financially by the COVID-19 pandemic.

Notable works

References

External links 
Official website

Further reading 
Greetings From | HYPEBEAST
One Couple's Road Trip Is About To Go Down In History
Victor Ving & Lisa Beggs of the Greetings Tour
Greetings Tour

Murals
Postcards